Arrigo Sacchi (born 1 April 1946) is an Italian former professional football coach. He has twice managed AC Milan (1987–1991, 1996–1997), with great success. He won the Serie A title in his 1987–88 debut season and then dominated European football by winning back to back European Cups in 1989 and 1990. From 1991 to 1996, he was head coach of the Italy national team and led them to the 1994 FIFA World Cup Final, where they lost to Brazil in a penalty shoot-out.

Sacchi is regarded as one of the greatest managers of all time and his Milan side (1987–1991) is widely regarded to be one of the greatest club sides to ever play the game, and by some to be the greatest of all time.

Sacchi was never a professional football player and for many years worked as a shoe salesman. This led to his famous quote directed at those who questioned his qualifications: "I never realised that in order to become a jockey you have to have been a horse first." Another famous Sacchi quote is that "football is the most important of the least important things in life."

Career

Early career
Sacchi had grown up watching attacking sides, such as Budapest Honvéd, Real Madrid, Brazil and the Netherlands. He started his career managing his local club, Baracca Lugo, because he was not good enough to play for them. Of the challenge he faced, Sacchi said, "I was twenty-six, my goalkeeper was thirty-nine and my centre-forward was thirty-two. I had to win them over." He next coached at Bellaria before joining Cesena, who were in the Serie B, as a youth team coach. He then took over at Rimini who were playing in the Serie C1, and almost led them to a title.

He received his breakthrough when he moved to Fiorentina as a youth coach. His achievements with the youth team earned interest from Parma, who were then playing in Serie C1. He led Parma to promotion in his first season, and in the following season took them to within 3 points of promotion to Serie A. Of greater importance to his time at Parma, however, was the team's performance in the Coppa Italia; they beat AC Milan 1–0 in the group stages, and beat them again 1–0 on aggregate in the first knockout round. This was enough to attract interest from Milan club owner Silvio Berlusconi, who promptly appointed Sacchi as manager.

AC Milan
At Milan, Sacchi again faced problems of credibility. The press argued that such an inadequate player could never go on to be a successful coach, and that even Berlusconi – who had played football at amateur level – was probably a better player. Sacchi wittily replied "I never realised that in order to become a jockey you have to have been a horse first." Sacchi was an instant success at the San Siro, leading Milan to its first Serie A title in nine years in his debut season, following up the league title with a Supercoppa Italiana in 1988.

Sacchi's success at Milan gained him two back-to-back European Cups. The success he gained was largely attributed to the Dutch trio he had purchased: Marco van Basten, Ruud Gullit and Frank Rijkaard. However, other great players such as Roberto Donadoni, as well as the defensive back four of Franco Baresi, Alessandro Costacurta, Mauro Tassotti and Paolo Maldini, were also a key to his success.

The first European Cup final in 1989 was against Steaua București, who were beaten resoundingly 4–0. Gullit and Van Basten scored two goals each and Milan lifted the European Cup for the first time in over 20 years. En route to the final, Milan had dispatched Real Madrid 6–1 on aggregate in the semi-final, a result which almost represented the passing of the mantle for best European club. The quarter-final against Werder Bremen was a tight affair; Milan only went through 1–0 on aggregate thanks to a Van Basten penalty. The second round was shrouded in controversy. Donadoni had his life saved only through the quick-thinking of the Red Star Belgrade physio, who broke his jaw to make a passage for oxygen to reach his lungs after he had suffered a bad foul and lay unconscious. The first leg ended in a 1–1 draw and the second leg got called off in 64th minute and rescheduled to be replayed the next day due to the thick fog (Milan was losing 0–1 at the moment). Milan eventually progressed following a penalty shoot-out.

Although the team was not as strong as they had been in the previous season, they were victorious again in 1990. After victories against HJK Helsinki, Real Madrid and KV Mechelen, Milan defeated German giants Bayern Munich in the semi-final, thanks to an away goal. The Dutch magic worked again in the final, as Frank Rijkaard scored the only goal of the game through a Van Basten assist to conquer Sven-Göran Eriksson's Benfica. By winning the final, Milan became the first team which retained the title since 1980, and the last team to do so until Real Madrid would manage to achieve this feat 27 years later. Sacchi would also capture back to back European Super Cups and Intercontinental Cups in 1989 and 1990, and would lead Milan to the final of the 1989–90 Coppa Italia, where they were defeated by Juventus. The following season saw them defeated by eventual runners-up Marseille in the quarter-final, and finish second in Serie A behind Sampdoria, while they were eliminated in the semi-finals of the Coppa Italia by eventual champions Roma. This was Sacchi's last season with i Rossoneri.

Italy national team
In November 1991, Sacchi was appointed manager of the Italy national team, replacing Azeglio Vicini. Sacchi based his Italian selection predominantly on Milan players, especially in the defensive line which featured Paolo Maldini and Franco Baresi; the attacking line was led by talismanic 1993 Ballon d'or winner Roberto Baggio of Juventus. Notable exclusions from Sacchi's Azzurri selections, however, included Gianluca Vialli, Roberto Mancini, Giuseppe Bergomi and Walter Zenga.

Sacchi successfully led Italy through the qualification campaign to reach the 1994 FIFA World Cup. Despite not being among the favourites and losing their first match 1–0 to the Republic of Ireland, Italy reached the final (their first since 1982), where they were defeated by Brazil in a penalty shoot-out, the first ever shootout in a World Cup final. Under Sacchi, Italy qualified for UEFA Euro 1996, but were eliminated from a group which included the eventual finalists, Germany and the Czech Republic.

Later coaching and executive career
After leaving his position with the national team, Sacchi returned to Milan to replace Óscar Tabárez in December 1996. However, the second spell was unsuccessful with Milan finishing 11th in the league and suffering its worst ever Serie A defeat, losing 6–1 at home to eventual champions Juventus.

Sacchi had brief spells in the Spanish La Liga, taking charge of Atlético Madrid in 1998 after his second spell with the Rossoneri, where he left his post in March of that season, with them languishing in the bottom half of the table. He also briefly returned to Parma in 2001, replacing Alberto Malesani, but resigned after only 3 matches (2 draws, 1 victory) for stress reasons, to be replaced by Renzo Ulivieri. He later returned to Madrid, this time at the Santiago Bernabéu Stadium as director of football at Real Madrid for the 2004–05 season.

Management style, reception, and influence
Nicknamed "The Prophet of Fusignano", Sacchi is regarded as one of the greatest managers of all-time. He favored a fluid, yet highly organised attacking 4–4–2 formation, discarding the traditional libero in an era where Italian football was mainly focussed on strong defensive play, and Helenio Herrera's Catenaccio tactics were still a strong influence. Defensively, Sacchi's teams adopted a zonal marking system, which had already been introduced by his predecessor Nils Liedholm, and were known for their defensive strength, conceding few goals; indeed, the defensive quartet of Maldini, Baresi, Costacurta, and Tassotti, which Sacchi deployed both at Milan and with the Italy national team, is regarded as one of the greatest defences of all-time.

Sacchi believes in the Dutch concept of Total Football, insisting that young players should be coached in all aspects of football rather than into specialist positions, helping the team both with or without the ball. He was also a firm believer in team ethic and treating all players as equals, once saying, "The only way you can build a side is by getting players who speak the same language and can play a team game. You can’t achieve anything on your own, and if you do, it doesn’t last long. I often quote what Michelangelo said: 'The spirit guides the hand.'" To perfect his team's cohesion, Sacchi introduced "shadow play", where his players would simulate a match in training without a football. As a coach, he also attracted controversy, as he was known for implementing a strict and rigorous training regime upon his players, and his teams were often known for their work ethic and discipline. Sacchi is also remembered for his outspokenness, stubbornness and his meticulous, obsessive attention to detail when preparing tactical solutions and perfecting plays, which his players were then expected to memorise and implement consistently during matches.

Sacchi is also credited as an innovator, popularising high pressing from his teams, the offside trap, and a high defensive line with no more than 25 metres between defence and attack. This style of pressing has been emulated successfully by José Mourinho's Porto, Pep Guardiola's Barcelona, Jürgen Klopp's Borussia Dortmund and Jupp Heynckes's Bayern Munich. His successor at Milan, Fabio Capello, retained Sacchi's tactics and went on to win four Scudetti in five seasons and the 1993–94 Champions League. Spanish coach Rafael Benítez – who won the UEFA Cup and La Liga with Valencia, the UEFA Champions League and FA Cup with Liverpool, the FIFA Club World Cup with Internazionale and the UEFA Europa League with Chelsea – cites Sacchi as his role model and "the coach who has revolutionised football in the past 50 years".

Career statistics

Honours
Parma
Serie C1: 1985–86

Milan
Serie A: 1987–88
Supercoppa Italiana: 1988
European Cup: 1988–89, 1989–90
European Super Cup: 1989, 1990
Intercontinental Cup: 1989, 1990
Coppa Italia Runners-up: 1989–90

Italy
FIFA World Cup Runners-up: 1994
Individual
Seminatore d'Oro: 1988, 1989
World Soccer Awards Manager of the Year: 1989
Greatest Manager of All Time – one of 5 managers ranked top 10 by France Football, World Soccer and ESPN
3rd place (France Football): 2019
6th place (World Soccer): 2013
6th place (ESPN): 2013
European Coach of the Year—Sepp Herberger Award: 1989
European Coach of the Season: 1989–90
Italian Football Hall of Fame: 2011
UEFA President's Award: 2022

References

1946 births
Living people
Sportspeople from the Province of Ravenna
A.C. Bellaria Igea Marina players
Italian football managers
Rimini F.C. 1912 managers
Parma Calcio 1913 managers
A.C. Milan managers
Italy national football team managers
Atlético Madrid managers
Serie A managers
La Liga managers
UEFA Champions League winning managers
1994 FIFA World Cup managers
UEFA Euro 1996 managers
Italian expatriate football managers
Italian expatriate sportspeople in Spain
Expatriate football managers in Spain